NADH dehydrogenase (ubiquinone) 1 alpha subcomplex, 4, 9kDa, pseudogene 1 is a protein that in humans is encoded by the NDUFA4P1 gene.

References

Further reading 

Pseudogenes